The 1997 Clemson Tigers football team represented Clemson University during the 1997 NCAA Division I-A football season. Clemson played its first overtime game on November 8 against Duke.

Schedule

References

Clemson
Clemson Tigers football seasons
Clemson Tigers football